Pseudocatharylla angolica is a species of moth in the family Crambidae. It was described by Stanisław Błeszyński in 1964. It is found in Angola and South Africa.

References

Crambinae
Moths described in 1964